A Counterfeit Silence : Selected Poems (1969) is a poetry collection by Australian poet and novelist Randolph Stow.  It won the Grace Leven Prize for Poetry in 1969.

The collection consists of 65 poems, most of which were published in various Australian poetry publications.

Contents

Critical reception 

Geoff Page, reviewing the collection in The Canberra Times, found a unique voice: "Randolph Stow is one of the few younger Australian poets who have found truly individual voices. It is a voice which will not please everyone for it can be high-pitched and contorted but it is unique, and that, these days, is a distinct achievement."

While reviewing the book as a part of a survey of Australian poetry of the time, Ronald Dunlop noted: "Here, landscape slips into place. Randolph Stow’s poetry, strongly rooted in the earth, reaches out from it to the other world of humanity. Essentially the poetry of experience, its promise is great, its performance so far impressive."

Notes 
 Epigraph: "Even speech was for them a debased form of silence; how much more futile is poetry, which is a debased form of speech." Thornton Wilder: The Bridge of San Luis Rey
 Dedication: To Jock Curle

See also
 1969 in Australian literature

References

Australian poetry collections
1969 books
Randolph Stow
Angus & Robertson books